Motherwell and Wishaw is a burgh constituency of the House of Commons of the Parliament of the United Kingdom. It was created in 1974, mostly from the former Motherwell constituency. In 1983, it was split into two constituencies, Motherwell North and Motherwell South; but these were amalgamated in 1997 to recreate the old Motherwell and Wishaw constituency.

The corresponding Scottish Parliamentary seat of the same name Motherwell and Wishaw was held by Jack McConnell, the former First Minister of Scotland from November 2001 until May 2007.

Constituency profile
The seat is situated in the south-west of the North Lanarkshire council area, and is dominated by the towns of Motherwell and Wishaw. Residents' wealth and health are around average for the UK.

Boundaries

1974–1983: The burgh of Motherwell and Wishaw.

1997–2005: The Motherwell District electoral divisions of Clydevale, Dalziel, and Wishaw.

2005–present: The North Lanarkshire electoral divisions of: 
In full: Motherwell South East and Ravenscraig, Motherwell West, Wishaw
In part: Bellshill, Mossend and Holytown, Motherwell North, Murdostoun.

In the boundary changes for 2005, small parts of Hamilton North and Bellshill and Airdrie and Shotts were added to this seat.

Members of Parliament

Elections

Elections of the 2010s

Elections of the 2000s

Elections of the 1990s

Elections of the 1970s

References
Specific

General

Westminster Parliamentary constituencies in Scotland
Constituencies of the Parliament of the United Kingdom established in 1974
Constituencies of the Parliament of the United Kingdom disestablished in 1983
Constituencies of the Parliament of the United Kingdom established in 1997
Motherwell
Wishaw
Politics of North Lanarkshire